Cifuna is a genus of tussock moths in the family Erebidae. The genus was erected by Francis Walker in 1855.

Species
Cifuna glauca Chao, 1987
Cifuna glaucozona (Collenette, 1934)
Cifuna infuscata Chao, 1987
Cifuna locuples Walker, 1855

References

Lymantriinae
Moth genera